Brandon Tate Nimmo (born March 27, 1993) is an American professional baseball outfielder for the New York Mets of Major League Baseball (MLB). He was drafted by the Mets in the first round of the 2011 MLB draft, and made his MLB debut with them in 2016.

Early life and education
Nimmo was born to Ron, a certified public accountant from La Junta, Colorado, and Patti Nimmo in Cheyenne, Wyoming. He has a brother, Bryce (who had a successful college baseball career at the University of Nebraska), and a sister, Kristen. He wanted to be a bull rider as a child. He grew up a Colorado Rockies fan.

Nimmo attended Cheyenne East High School in Cheyenne. As Wyoming is one of only three states that do not offer high school baseball, Nimmo played American Legion Baseball. In , he batted .448 with 15 home runs and 34 stolen bases in 70 games for his club, Post 6.

The Mets scouted Nimmo's Legion games and other events. One such event was the 2010 Under Armour All-America Baseball Game at Wrigley Field, where Nimmo went 2-for-4 with a triple, two runs scored and two runs batted in to earn co-MVP honors with pitcher Nick Burdi.

Baseball America ranked Nimmo among the Top 50 prospects for the 2011 draft at number 35. Of the 13 players selected from Wyoming high schools, the previous highest pick was pitcher Michael Beaver, selected by the Philadelphia Phillies in the sixth round (109th overall) of the 1966 Major League Baseball draft. Nimmo signed for $2.1 million at the age of 18. If left unsigned, he had a verbal commitment to attend the University of Arkansas.

Professional career

Minor league career

Nimmo played ten games with the Gulf Coast Mets and the Kingsport Mets towards the end of the  season. He combined to hit .211 with four runs batted in. He spent the following season with the Class A-Short Season Brooklyn Cyclones of the New York–Penn League. On July 30, Nimmo posted the first four-hit game of his career, falling just a triple short of the cycle, with three runs scored and two RBIs to lead the Cyclones in a 10–5 win over the Mahoning Valley Scrappers. On August 18, Nimmo capped a career-high six-RBI night with his second grand slam of the season. For the season, Nimmo batted .248 with six home runs and forty RBIs in 266 at bats. Nimmo placed fourth in doubles and fifth in RBIs for the New York–Penn League.

Nimmo began the  season with the Class-A Savannah Sand Gnats and was ranked fourth among Mets prospects. By April 17, Nimmo was the  leading hitter in the South Atlantic League with a .447 batting average, earning him a SAL mid-season All-Star nod. He was also voted into the  All-Star Futures Game held at the Mets' Citi Field.

By season's end, his batting average fell to .273 with two home runs and forty RBIs. His performance at the plate was considered underwhelming as he averaged more than a strikeout per game. His numbers may have been hampered by a spacious home ballpark in Savannah that's tough on lefty power hitters, as well as a wrist injury that caused him to miss some games.

Nimmo started the  season with Class-A Advanced St. Lucie Mets of the Florida State League. After batting .322 with four home runs, 25 RBIs, a .448 on-base percentage and .458 slugging percentage to earn FSL All-Star honors, he received a mid-season promotion to Double-A Binghamton Mets on June 19. Between his two clubs, Nimmo posted a .278 average, 10 home runs and 51 RBI.

After a brief four game stint with St. Lucie at the start of the  season, Nimmo was promoted to the Binghamton Mets. He suffered a knee injury on April 29 that caused him to miss some playing time. Prior to the knee injury, Nimmo was batting .297 with a .368 on-base percentage and a .420 slugging percentage in 34 games. On July 28, it was announced that Nimmo was promoted to the Mets  Triple-A affiliate, Las Vegas 51s as the starting center fielder. Once again, his season was interrupted by injury when he fouled a baseball off his nose in a batting cage. The Mets added him to their 40-man roster after the season to protect him from the Rule 5 draft.

Major league career

2016
Nimmo began the  season with the Las Vegas 51s; through 250 at bats he was hitting .328 with five home runs and 37 RBIs. Nimmo was promoted to the Major Leagues on June 25 to replace the slumping Michael Conforto whose batting average had fallen to .130 since May 1.  He made his major league debut the next day against the Atlanta Braves and went 0-for-4. On June 27, his second game, Nimmo recorded his first hit and his first run against Washington Nationals pitcher Joe Ross and went 2-4 overall. On July 1, he hit his first home run, a three-run homer against Jason Hammel of the Chicago Cubs, making the game 7–1 in the bottom of the fourth inning. On July 17, Nimmo was sent down to the Triple-A Las Vegas 51s after batting .235 with one home run and four RBIs in 51 at-bats. On July 29, Nimmo was once again promoted after Juan Lagares suffered a torn thumb ligament and undertook surgery to repair the injury.

2017–18

In 2017, Brandon Nimmo was chosen to be part of Team Italy in the World Baseball Classic. While playing in the World Baseball Classic, Nimmo strained his right hamstring. The injury left him unable to join the Mets Opening Day roster, and when he recovered in late April, he began his season in the minor leagues.  He remained with Las Vegas until June 16, when injuries to Juan Lagares and Matt Harvey led to Nimmo and Matt Reynolds returning to the Major Leagues. Nimmo started strong, hitting .350/.458/.400 over 24 plate appearances. However, he was placed on the disabled list with a partially collapsed lung on July 8 and would not return until July 28. Nimmo would finish the 2017 season appearing in 69 games for the Mets, batting .260/.379/.418 with 5 home runs. Late in the year, hitting coaches Kevin Long and Pat Roessler suggested that Nimmo try hitting without his front foot striding forward. Nimmo took the suggestion, which allowed his front foot to turn open and generate better hip rotation. Up until that August, Nimmo had slugged .346 in his career. He slugged .479 in September and continued to show increased power in 2018, slugging over .500 through the season's first two months. In 2018, Nimmo batted .263/.404/.483, with 17 home runs and 47 RBI. He led the majors in hit by pitch, with 20.

2019
On April 17, 2019, Nimmo was taken out of the first inning of a game due to a stiff neck, and missed two games. On May 21, he once again experienced neck stiffness and went on the injured list. He was later found to have a bulging disk in his neck and went through a rough rehabilitation assignment, not appearing in the Mets' lineup again until September 1. In 2019, Nimmo batted .221/.375/.407 with 8 home runs and 29 RBIs in 69 games. He had the fastest home run trot of all major league players, at 17.7 seconds.

2020
In the pandemic-shortened 2020 season, Nimmo hit .280/.404/.484 with 8 home runs and 18 RBIs in 55 games.

2021
In 2021, Nimmo missed most of May and all of June due to a bruised hand. He returned to the active roster in July, but suffered a hamstring strain on September 4 and missed two weeks. He finished the 2021 season batting .292/.401/.437 with 8 home runs and 28 RBIs in 92 games.

2022
Nimmo finished the 2022 season batting .274/.367/.433 with 16 home runs and 64 RBIs in 151 games. On December 10, 2022, Nimmo signed an 8-year contract worth $162 million dollars to remain with the Mets.

Personal life
Nimmo married Chelsea Bradley in November 2017 in Savannah, Georgia. Nimmo is a Christian.

References

External links

1993 births
Living people
American people of Scottish descent
Baseball players from Wyoming
Binghamton Mets players
Brooklyn Cyclones players
Gulf Coast Mets players
Kingsport Mets players
Las Vegas 51s players
Major League Baseball outfielders
New York Mets players
Savannah Sand Gnats players
Scottsdale Scorpions players
Sportspeople from Cheyenne, Wyoming
St. Lucie Mets players
2017 World Baseball Classic players
Syracuse Mets players
American Christians